Hydrogenophaga atypica is a Gram-negative, oxidase-positive, rod-shaped, motile bacterium from the Comamonadaceae family, which was isolated from wastewater from an activated sludge. Colonies of H. atypica are pale yellow.

References

External links
Type strain of Hydrogenophaga palleronii at BacDive -  the Bacterial Diversity Metadatabase

Comamonadaceae
Bacteria described in 2005